Kaori Moriwaka (森若香織, Moriwaka Kaori, born 11 December 1963 in Sapporo, Hokkaido) is a singer-songwriter and actress. She was in the band The Go-Bang's and Ram Jam World; more recently, she portrayed Ikuko Tsukino in the live-action TV series Pretty Guardian Sailor Moon.  She also wrote songs and played the guitar as a back musician for Japanese girl band Chee's.

Discography

Singles
 1995: Happy Fine Day (video "Happy People" ending song)
 1996: Uwakina Darling (ending song "Guru Guru Nainti Nain" Japan TV system)
 1997: Heaven (Anime "Power Doll project α" theme song)

Albums
 1996: LOVE OR DIE 
 1997: HEAVEN
 2004: LOVESONG for HEAVEN

Mini-albums
 1995: DRAINED CHERRY 
 1999: W RainBow 
 2007: Fantastic Philosophy 
 2007: ByeByeBye

DVD
 2004: LOVESONG for HEAVEN

Filmography

Variety
 Erina Matsui ni Monomane

Drama
 Pretty Guardian Sailor Moon (2003 – 2004, Central Japan Broadcasting Company)
 Girl Meets Girl (2005, BS Fuji)

Other TV shows
 Funky tomato ( TVK, circa 1992) MC
 Guitar Ohyakka ~ Korezo Guitar A to Z ~ (29 March 2007, NHK)
 Uta no Rakuen ( TV Tokyo 23 January 2011)
 Arigato Tsu! (TVK, 2013.8.21) Guest

Stage
 Cinderella Story ( Toho musical, 2003, 2005 replay)
 Door o akeru to ... ( ready-to-wear, 2006)

Movie
 Idainaru, Shurara Bon ( Toei, Asmik Ace will be released 8 March 2014)

Radio
 Moriwaka Kaori no All Night Nippon ( NBS – March in October 1990, 1988)
 Indies file ( NHK-FM broadcasting, April 2007 – broadcast on the last Sunday of every month)
 AGES_ ~ Ages~ ( NBS – Tuesday, Thursday charge in October 2012)

External links
Official site 
Official blog 

1963 births
Living people
Japanese women pop singers
Japanese women singer-songwriters
Musicians from Sapporo
21st-century Japanese actresses
20th-century Japanese women singers
20th-century Japanese singers
21st-century Japanese women singers
21st-century Japanese singers